John Scrope may refer to:
 John Scrope, 4th Baron Scrope of Masham (c. 1388–1455), English peer, Privy Councillor and Treasurer of England
 John Scrope, 5th Baron Scrope of Bolton (1437–1498), English Yorkist nobleman
 John Scrope, 8th Baron Scrope of Bolton (c. 1510–1549)
 John Scrope (MP) (c. 1662–1752), British lawyer and politician